Segovesus (Gaulish: 'Worthy of Victories') is a legendary Gallic chief of the Bituriges, said to have lived ca. 600 BC. According to a legend recounted by Livy, the king Ambigatus sent his sister's sons Bellovesus and Segovesus in search of new lands to settle because of overpopulation in their homeland. While Bellovesus is said to have led the Gallic invasion of northern Italy, Segovesus reportedly headed towards the Hercynian Forest, in Western Central Europe.

According to an ancient tradition, modern southern Germany was settled by Celts as a consequence of this migration. Although the historicity of this legend is highly disputed, the essence of the myth may have been based on actual events, for migrations actually occurred towards Bohemia and bordering regions of Central Europe during the first quarter of the 4th century BC.

Etymology
The Gaulish personal name Sego-uesus literally means 'worthy of victories'. Old Irish  'in excellence',  'goodness', Welsh  'worthy, valuable').

Story 
The legend is recounted by the Roman historian Livy in his Ab Urbe Condita Libri, written in the late 1st century BC:

See also
 Hercynian Forest

References 
Citations

Primary sources

 

Bibliography

7th-century BC rulers
Celtic warriors
Gaulish rulers